Nathaniel Monroe Kellogg (September 28, 1858July 19, 1923) was a Major League Baseball shortstop. He played in five games for the 1885 Detroit Wolverines. He continued to play in the minor leagues through 1891, primarily in the New England League and Northwestern League.

Sources

Major League Baseball shortstops
Detroit Wolverines players
Baseball players from Iowa
1858 births
1923 deaths
Nashville Americans players
Hamilton Clippers players
Duluth Freezers players
St. Paul Saints (Northwestern League) players
Buffalo Bisons (minor league) players
Manchester Maroons players
19th-century baseball players